Creston Township is one of nineteen townships in Ashe County, North Carolina, United States. The township has a population of 612 as of the 2010 census.

Creston Township occupies  in central Ashe County. There are no incorporated municipalities located in Creston Township, but there are several unincorporated communities, including Creston, Grayson, and Parker.

References

Townships in Ashe County, North Carolina
Townships in North Carolina